The Asian Women's Club Volleyball Championship, previously the AVC Cup Women's Club Tournament (between 1999 and 2002), is an annual continental club volleyball competition organised by the Asian Volleyball Confederation (AVC), the sport's continental governing body. The competition was first contested in 1999 in Thailand. It was not held in 2003 and 2020 due to 2002–2004 SARS outbreak and COVID-19 pandemic respectively.

The winner of the Asian Women's Club Volleyball Championship qualifies for the FIVB Volleyball Women's Club World Championship.

Tianjin Bohai Bank holds the record for most victories, winning the competition five times. Teams from China have won the tournament eight times, the most for any nation. The current Asian club champions is Kuanysh, who defeated Altay (3–2) in the final of the 2022 event.

Format
The overview of the competition format in the 2021 tournament was as follows:
16 teams competed in the final tournament, including the hosts which were automatically qualified.
Teams were seeded by the result of 2019 Asian Women's Club Volleyball Championship, based on a serpentine system.
The tournament was held in 8 days.
A team had a maximum 22 team members: 14 players, 6 officials, 1 accompanying referee, and 1 press with FIVB ID.
A maximum of two foreign players, with a valid International Transfer Certificate, are allowed to be on court at the same time.
In addition, the hosting national federation might have an additional team entry only in case of less than 8 participating teams.

Championships

Performances by club

Performances by country

Performances by zonal association

Medals
As of 2022 Asian Women's Club Volleyball Championship.

MVP by edition 
1999 –  (LG Oil)
2000 – not awarded
2001 –  (Shanghai)
2002 –  (Hisamitsu Springs)
2003 – tournament canceled
2004 –  (Rahat Almaty)
2005 –  (Tianjin Bridgestone)
2006 –  (Tianjin Bridgestone)
2007 –  (Rahat Almaty)
2008 –  (Tianjin Bridgestone)
2009 –  (Federbrau)
2010 –  (Federbrau)
2011 –  (Chang)
2012 –  (Tianjin Bridgestone)
2013 –  (Guangdong Evergrande)
2014 –  (Hisamitsu Springs)
2015 –  (Bangkok Glass)
2016 –  (NEC Red Rockets)
2017 –  (Supreme Chonburi)
2018 –  (Supreme Chonburi)
2019 –  (Tianjin Bohai Bank)
2020 – tournament canceled
2021 –  (Altay)
2022 –  (Kuanysh)

See also

Asian Men's Club Volleyball Championship

References

External links
 Website Official
 Asian Volleyball Confederation at Facebook
 Asian Volleyball Confederation at Twitter
 Asian Volleyball Confederation at Instagram

 

 
Club Women
Recurring sporting events established in 1999
April sporting events
May sporting events